James Todd Smith (who goes by Todd Smith) is an American singer and founding member of the contemporary Christian music band Selah. He remains an original member since its founding in 1997.

Early life
Smith grew up the son of missionaries in Zaire, Africa (now the Democratic Republic of the Congo) in a home built by his grandparents, who had been missionaries to the continent since the 1930s. His grandfather worked as a dentist in the United States before moving to Zaire. Smith's father was born in Africa, but later moved to Detroit, Michigan. Both Smith's grandparents died in Africa.

Smith's family home burned to the ground when he was five. After the fire, his father felt a call to the mission field of Africa. Smith's father moved his mother, three siblings, and himself from Detroit, Michigan, to Africa. His family remained there for the next eight years.

Smith has remarked that he never questioned his Biblical teaching. Smith gives credit for his music career to his missionary upbringing.  "I've been singing in front of people since I was three," he said. "My parents are missionaries.  When we came back to the United States, we had to visit each church that sponsored us.  That was a good training ground." Smith is married to Angie Smith and they have four daughters. They had one other daughter named Audrey, who was born in April 2008 and died a few hours later due to cardiac issues. Angie has written two books, I Will Carry You: The Sacred Dance of Grief and Joy and What Women Fear: Walking in Faith that Transforms.

Recording career
Selah was originally formed by brother and sister, Todd and Nicol Smith, along with friend Allan Hall. Smith also worked on a solo project. His debut album Alive was released on August 10, 2004 with Curb Records.  The album steered from the common sound Selah offered, better known for well integrated harmonies, singing hymns and melodic ballads. A passion for the sound of rock music was more of what Smith had in mind when working on this album. Bands such as Boston, Foreigner, Journey, and Genesis influenced the sound in Alive. This has been his only solo release to date.

Smith continues to work with Allan Hall and Amy Perry, current members of Selah. Their most recent album, Hope of the Broken World, was released on August 23, 2011 with Curb Records. He recorded the solo song "Broken Praise" on the various artists compilation album Music Inspired by "The Story" and the album won the "Special Event Album of the Year" on the 43rd GMA Dove Awards in 2012. He performed the song on the awards show. Smith wrote a song called "I Will Carry You" after Audrey Caroline died. "I Will Carry You" is dedicated to the memory of Audrey Caroline Smith.

Discography

Solo albums

Albums with Selah

Compilation contributions

References

External links
 

American performers of Christian music
Living people
Year of birth missing (living people)
21st-century American singers
American singer-songwriters
American male singer-songwriters
21st-century American male singers
20th-century American singers
20th-century American male singers